Juan Tafur (1500, Córdoba, Andalusia, Castile - ?, ?) was a Spanish conquistador who participated in the Spanish conquest of the Muisca people. He was a cousin of fellow conquistadors Martín Yañéz Tafur, Hernán Venegas Carrillo and Pedro Fernández de Valenzuela. Juan Tafur was five times encomendero (mayor) of Santa Fe de Bogotá. He also received the encomiendas of Pasca, Chipaque and Usaquén. The encomienda of Suesca was shared between Tafur and Gonzalo García Zorro.

Knowledge of the life of Juan Tafur has been provided by the work El Carnero (1638), by chronicler Juan Rodríguez Freyle.

Biography

Family
Juan Tafur was born in the year 1500 in Córdoba, Spain. His parents were Juan Pérez Tubera and Isabel Díaz Tafur. Tafur took the surname of his mother. Other family members were also conquistadors: Pedro Fernández de Valenzuela, Hernán Venegas Carrillo and Martín Yañés Tafur.

American Expeditions
In 1518 he left Spain for the New World under the command of Pedro de los Ríos, governor of Tierra Firme in Panama. De los Ríos sent Tafur with two ships to retrieve the dissatisfied members of the Pizarro expedition. In 1531 or 1533, Tafur left for Santa Marta, where he was sent to the Valle de Upar, together with conquistadors Antonio de Lebrija, Juan de Sanct Martín, Juan Muñoz de Collantes and Juan de Céspedes to force the submission the Chimila people to the Spanish.

In April 1536, Tafur was appointed cavalry leader in the expedition led by Gonzalo Jiménez de Quesada which left the Caribbean city of Santa Marta in search of El Dorado. Tafur participated in the Spanish conquest of the Muisca people and received the encomiendas of Pasca, Usaque, Itaque and Chipaque, where he built the first church in 1538. The encomienda of Suesca was shared between Juan Tafur and Gonzalo García Zorro.

Mayoralties

Juan Tafur was five times encomendero of Santa Fe de Bogotá: in 1541 succeeding Antonio Díaz de Cardoso and preceding Juan Díaz Hidalgo; from 1546 to 1547 succeeding Juan de Céspedes and succeeded by Pedro de Colmenares; in 1552 between the reigns of Juan Muñoz de Collantes and Gonzalo Rodríguez de Ledesma; in 1554 succeeding Gonzalo García Zorro and before Juan Ruiz de Orejuela; and finally in 1559 after the rule of Gonzalo Rodríguez de Ledesma and preceding Antonio Bermúdez. In 1552, he requested 72 emeralds from Diego de Aguilar.

Mistreatment of native Americans

He committed various atrocities against the indigenous people, including against the Panche people to the west of the Bogotá savanna. He mistreated the Cacique (leader) of Pasca and the Cacique of Chita, whose body he threw at the dogs. In 1543, he was convicted for the mistreatment of the indigenous Muisca of Pasca.

Personal life

Juan Tafur was married three times: to an unnamed woman; to Antonia Manuel de Hoyos; and to Francisca de Ulloa. He had a daughter named Isabel Tafur.

Encomiendas

See also 

List of conquistadors in Colombia
Spanish conquest of the Muisca
Hernán Pérez de Quesada, Juan de Céspedes
Gonzalo Jiménez de Quesada

References

Bibliography

Further reading 
 
 
 
 
 
 
 

1500 births
Year of death unknown
16th-century Spanish people
16th-century explorers
Spanish conquistadors
Andalusian conquistadors
People from Córdoba, Spain
Encomenderos
Mayors of Bogotá
History of Colombia
History of the Muisca